The Hydrogenothermaceae family are bacteria that live in harsh environmental settings. They have been found in hot springs, sulfur pools, and thermal ocean vents. They are true bacteria as opposed to the other inhabitants of extreme environments, the Archaea. An example occurrence of certain extremophiles in this family are organisms of the genus Sulfurihydrogenibium  that are capable of surviving in extremely hot environments such as Hverigerdi, Iceland.

Obtaining energy
Hydrogenothermaceae families  consist of aerobic or microaerophilic bacteria, which generally obtain energy by oxidation of hydrogen or reduced sulfur compounds by molecular oxygen.

Phylogeny
The currently accepted taxonomy is based on the List of Prokaryotic names with Standing in Nomenclature (LSPN) and the National Center for Biotechnology Information (NCBI).

References

 Hedlund, Brian P., et al. “Isolation of Diverse Members of the Aquificales from Geothermal Springs in Tengchong, China.” Frontiers in Microbiology, vol. 6, 2015, .

External links

Aquificota